Mount Baker Wilderness is a  wilderness area within the Mount Baker-Snoqualmie National Forest in the western Cascade Range of northern Washington state. Its eastern border is shared with the boundary of the Stephen Mather Wilderness and North Cascades National Park for a distance of 40 miles (65 kilometers). The wilderness extends from State Route 20 north to the Canada–US border. On the west, it is bounded by the foothills of the Puget Sound lowlands.

Almost entirely within Whatcom County, the wilderness lies on the western slopes of the Cascade Mountains. The three forks of the Nooksack River and the Baker River are the major drainages of the wilderness.

Ecology 
Vegetative cover is typical of the west slopes of the Cascades including western redcedar, coast Douglas-fir, noble fir, Pacific silver fir, subalpine fir, western hemlock and mountain hemlock, and at higher elevations, alpine meadows. Animals include mountain goats and hoary marmots. On mountains and higher ridges, considerable areas of rock and permanent glaciers (over 10,000 acres (40 km2)) occur.

Geology 

The terrain is rugged, with steep slopes and numerous ridges dissected by small intermittent or permanent drainages. Mount Baker, an active volcano, is one of the area's most distinctive features. The mountain periodically exhibits thermal activity. Other major mountains include:

 Twin Sisters Mountain, North Twin – 
 Twin Sisters Mountain, South Twin – 
 Tomyhoi Peak – 
 American Border Peak – 
 Mount Larrabee (früher: Red Mountain) – 
 Goat Mountain – 
 Mount Sefrit – 
 Ruth Mountain – 
 Hadley Peak – 

The wilderness is wholly contained within Mount Baker-Snoqualmie National Forest and is adjacent to the Mount Baker National Recreation Area.

See also
 Mount Baker-Snoqualmie National Forest
 Ecology of the North Cascades

References

External links
 
Mt. Baker Wilderness U.S. Forest Service 
Mount Baker Wilderness The University of Montana (adapted PD source)

Baker
IUCN Category Ib
North Cascades of Washington (state)
Protected areas of Whatcom County, Washington
Wilderness areas of Washington (state)
Mount Baker-Snoqualmie National Forest
Protected areas established in 1984
1984 establishments in Washington (state)